Kirksville Courthouse Square Historic District is a national historic district located at Kirksville, Adair County, Missouri. The district encompasses 10 contributing buildings and 2 contributing objects in the central business district of Kirksville. It developed between 1883 and 1925, and includes representative examples of Italianate, Romanesque Revival, and Classical Revival style architecture.  Located in the district is the separately listed Adair County Courthouse.  Other notable buildings include the Union Meat Market (c.1890; façade c. 1905), Irwin Davis Sheet Metal Company (c. 1905), Baxter-Miller Apartment Building (1925), Ivie's Hotel (1883), and Pickler's Famous Store (1887).

It was listed on the National Register of Historic Places in 2009.

References

Historic districts on the National Register of Historic Places in Missouri
Italianate architecture in Missouri
Romanesque Revival architecture in Missouri
Neoclassical architecture in Missouri
Buildings and structures in Adair County, Missouri
National Register of Historic Places in Adair County, Missouri